The actual tune first appeared in the 1943 film The Outlaw, as the film's main theme. 

John O'Dreams was written by an Englishman, Bill Caddick, (1944-2018), and later became famous in Irish Traditional music. Caddick was born in Wolverhampton, England. The titular central character is equivalent to the Sandman, a fictional character who sends people to sleep. The song portrays all people as being "equal in sleep":

All things are equal when the day is done
The Prince and the ploughman, the slave and freeman
All find their comfort in old John O'Dreams

In this context, sleep may also be considered a metaphor for death, both as an eventual equalizer of all things, and for the allusion to a "crossing over," as in a river, a prevalent theme in Western spiritual beliefs.

The most popular arrangements are by English singer/songwriter Bill Caddick. Singers Gordon Bok, Éilís Kennedy, Christy Moore, Jean Redpath, Max Boyce, Garnet Rogers and The Clancy Brothers with Robbie O'Connell also recorded versions. The enchanting arpeggiated melody is based on Tchaikovsky's Symphony No. 6, "The Pathetique", and is erroneously thought to have originated in either a Russian or Italian folksong. John O’Dreams is a character in Scottish author Fiona Macleod’s (William Sharp’s alias) “The Lynn of Dreams”, in the Winged Destiny

Lyrics 

When midnight comes and people homeward tread [Alternate: When midnight comes good people homeward tread]
Seek now your blanket and your feather bed
Home comes the rover, his journey's over [Alternate: Home is the rover, his journey over]
Yield up the night time to old John O' Dreams
Yield up the night time to old John O' Dreams

Across the hill, the sun has gone astray
Tomorrow's cares are many dreams away
The stars are flying, your candle is dying [Alternate: The stars are flying, the wind is sighing]
Yield up the darkness to old John O' Dreams
Yield up the darkness to old John O' Dreams

Both man and master in the night are one
All things are equal when the day is done
The prince and the ploughman, the slave and the freeman
All find their comfort with old John O' Dreams
All find their comfort with old John O' Dreams

When sleep it comes the dreams come running clear [Alternate: Now as  you sleep the dreams come winging clear]
The hawks of morning cannot reach you here [Alternate: The hawks of morning cannot harm you here]
Sleep is a river, flows on forever [Alternate: Sleep is your river, float on forever]
And for your boatman choose old John O' Dreams
And for your boatman choose old John O' Dreams

When midnight comes and people homeward tread [Alternate: When midnight comes good people homeward tread]
Seek now your blanket and your feather bed
Home comes the rover, his journey's over [Alternate: Home is the rover, his journey's over]
Yield up the night time to old John O' Dreams
Yield up the night time to old John O' Dreams

Year of song missing
English folk songs